Readmission of states may refer to:

 Reconstruction era of the United States, readmission of Confederate states as states of the United States in post-Civil War era of Reconstruction, 1868-'70
 The return to full participation of United Nations members